Carrs Tavern is an unincorporated community in Millstone Township in Monmouth County, New Jersey, United States.  It is located at the intersection of County Route 526 and County Route 571.

Author Caren Lissner wrote about the settlement in her essay A Rumble and a Scream: "I took Carrs Tavern Road (though I couldn't find the tavern)."

References

Millstone Township, New Jersey
Unincorporated communities in Monmouth County, New Jersey
Unincorporated communities in New Jersey